The 1970 SCCA Continental Championship was the fourth annual running of the Sports Car Club of America's professional open wheel racing series. The championship was open to Formula A cars, with both 305 cubic inch "stock block" V8 engines and 183 cubic inch "free design" engines being permitted in that category. For the first time in the history of the series, drivers competed for the L&M Championship Trophy and a share of a $40,000 prize fund. The championship was won by John Cannon driving a McLaren M10B Chevrolet. 

The SCCA also organized a separate Continental Championship for Formula B cars.

Race schedule
The championship was contested over a thirteen race series.

Points system
Championship points were awarded to drivers on a 20-15-12-10-8-6-4-3-2-1 basis for the first ten places in each race.

Championship standings

References

External links
My Formula 5000 - www.myf5000.com
oldracingcars.com - www.oldracingcars.com

SCCA Continental Championship
Continental Championship
Formula A (SCCA)
Formula 5000